Reckless is the 2004 debut studio album by Special D., released on Kontor Records. It charted at number 15 in the Netherlands and 28 in Germany.

Track listing

Original edition
 "Nothing I Won't Do" – 3:05
 Vocals by Terri Bjerre
 Written by Jake Williams
 "Reckless" – 4:33
 Vocals by Dennis Bohn
 "Come with Me" – 3:05
 Vocals by Laura Nori
 Written by Uwe Fahrenkrog-Petersen, Nena
 "You" – 5:48
 Vocals and written by Nathalie Tineo
 "Speaker Slayer" – 4:56
 Vocals by Special D.
 "Home Alone" – 3:05
 Vocals by Kimia Roth
 "Full Metal Jackass" – 4:41
 Vocals by Kevin Weatherspoon
 "Dust to Dust" – 5:09
 Vocals by Special D.
 "4maDJz" – 5:41
 Vocals by Noreen Quade
 "Once Again" – 5:26
 Vocals by Special D.
 "Like a Rider" – 5:49
 Vocals by Dennis Bohn, Laura Nori
 "King of da Beatz" – 4:05
 Written by Special D.
 "Someone to Love" – 5:03
 Vocals by Special D.
 "Keep the Faith" – 3:07
 Vocals by Verena Rehm
 Written by Axel Konrad, Verena Rehm

Japanese edition
"Nothing I Won't Do"
"Reckless"
"Come with Me"
"You"
"Speaker Slayer"
"Home Alone"
"Full Metal Jackass"
"Dust to Dust"
"4madjz"
"Once Again"
"Like a Rider"
"King of da Beatz"
"Someone to Love"
"Keep the Faith"
"One Day" (Special D. Remix) by Miraluna (bonus track)
"The Sign" (Special D. Remix) by Sven-R.G. Vs. Bass-T (bonus track)

Charts

References

2004 debut albums
Trance albums